Credokirken (formerly Levende Ord Bibelsenter Norwegian for "Living Word Bible Centre") is a charismatic megachurch in Bergen, Norway.  The church also has its own bible school (together with Pinsekirken Tabernaklet and SALT Bergenskirken), and an elementary school. The senior pastor is Olav Rønhovde.

History 

The congregation was founded in 1992 by Enevald Flåten.  The Church has connection with the Swedish church Livets Ord.

Flåten left the church in 2006 after an internal conflict. Olav Rønhovde then became senior pastor. In 2009, Levende ord changed its name to Credokirken (The Credo Church). Credo is Latin for "I believe".

In 2019, the church has 1,013 official members, and a weekly attendance of 2,000 people.

References

External links
Official Website

Evangelical megachurches in Norway
Churches in Vestland
Protestantism in Norway